Abu Layla ʿUday ibn Rabīʿa ibn al-Ḥāriṯ at-Taḡlibiyy ( 443 – 531 CE), also known by the nicknames al-Muhalhil ("he who finely weaves poems") and az-Zīr ("the philander"), was a pre-Islamic poet and warrior born in Najd. He led the Banu Taghlib tribe in the forty-year long War of Basus.

He was the maternal uncle of fellow poet Imru' al-Qais, and also the grandfather of Amr ibn Kulthum through his second daughter Layla.

References

443 births
531 deaths
5th-century Arabs
6th-century Arabic poets
Epic poets
Arab Christians